Mount Grosvenor is a  elevation glaciated summit located  west of Valdez in the Chugach Mountains of the U.S. state of Alaska, on land managed by Chugach National Forest. Although modest in elevation, relief is significant since the mountain rises from tidewater at Unakwik Inlet of Prince William Sound in approximately three miles. The mountain's name was applied in 1910 by Lawrence Martin, and officially adopted by the United States Geological Survey. This peak's name honors Gilbert Hovey Grosvenor (1875–1966), President of the National Geographic Society, father of photojournalism, and the first full-time editor of National Geographic magazine.

Climate

Based on the Köppen climate classification, Mount Grosvenor is located in a subarctic climate zone with long, cold, snowy winters, and mild summers. Weather systems coming off the Gulf of Alaska are forced upwards by the Chugach Mountains (orographic lift), causing heavy precipitation in the form of rainfall and snowfall. Temperatures can drop below −20 °C with wind chill factors below −30 °C. This climate supports the Meares and Columbia Glaciers surrounding this mountain. The months May through June offer the most favorable weather for climbing or viewing.

See also

List of mountain peaks of Alaska
Geography of Alaska

References

External links
  National Weather Service Forecast
 Mount Grosvenor Flickr photo

Mountains of Alaska
Landforms of Chugach Census Area, Alaska
North American 1000 m summits